Boris Abraham Sandoval Molina (born March 12, 1987 in Concepción, Chile) is a Chilean former footballer.

References

External links
 
 

1987 births
Living people
Sportspeople from Concepción, Chile
Chilean footballers
Chilean expatriate footballers
Naval de Talcahuano footballers
C.D. Huachipato footballers
Santiago Wanderers footballers
Ñublense footballers
Östers IF players
Rangers de Talca footballers
Cobreloa footballers
San Marcos de Arica footballers
Tercera División de Chile players
Primera B de Chile players
Chilean Primera División players
Superettan players
Segunda División Profesional de Chile players
Chilean expatriate sportspeople in Sweden
Expatriate footballers in Sweden
Association football defenders